Casualty (stylised as CASUAL+Y) is a British medical drama series that airs weekly on BBC One. Created by Jeremy Brock and Paul Unwin, it was first broadcast in the United Kingdom on BBC One on 6 September 1986. The original producer was Geraint Morris. Having been broadcast weekly since 1986, Casualty is the longest-running primetime medical drama series in the world.

The programme is set in the fictional Holby City Hospital and focuses on the staff and patients of the hospital's Accident and Emergency (A&E) Department. The show has strong ties to its sister programme Holby City, which began as a spin-off series from Casualty in 1999, set in the same hospital. The final episode of Holby City was broadcast in March 2022.

Casualtys exterior shots were mainly filmed outside the Ashley Down Centre in Bristol from 1986 until 2002, when they moved to the centre of Bristol. In 2011, Casualty celebrated its 25th anniversary and moved production to the Roath Lock Studios in Cardiff, where it is currently filmed. The 1,000th episode of Casualty aired on 25 June 2016. A feature-length 30th anniversary episode of Casualty aired on 27 August 2016, episode 1 of series 31. For the series 31 finale, creator Paul Unwin returned to write a special episode which was entirely recorded in one take using only one camera, five boom operators and forty microphones. On 17 March 2020, production on the series was postponed due to the COVID-19 pandemic along with all other BBC shows; filming resumed in September 2020. When Casualty returned, it had a shorter duration time of 40 minutes rather than its usual 50 minutes. It was later confirmed that Casualty would return on 2 January 2021.

Creation
The series was created by Jeremy Brock and Paul Unwin. According to writer Susan Wilkins, it was meant to be a response to the Margaret Thatcher era, and Unwin said that as young socialists, they wanted to create a "television revolution" that would be feminist, anti-racist, pro-NHS and anti-Conservative.

The creators discussed this again as part of YouTube and Podcast Creator David Hackett’s The Journey series.

Production

Location
Casualty and Holby City are both set in Holby City Hospital, in the fictional county of Wyvern, in the south-west of England.

From the show's inception to series 26, episode 16, the city exterior was represented by Bristol, including well-known landmarks such as the floating harbour and Clifton Suspension Bridge often visible in outdoor scenes. The City of Bristol College was used as the location for most exterior shots of the hospital from 1986 until 2002, when a new exterior set was built in Lawrence Hill Industrial Park in the city. Casualty has also filmed at Chavenage House back in 1997.

Following plans to switch filming to Birmingham, it was confirmed on 26 March 2009 that filming of Casualty from 2011 would move to a purpose-built studio and backlot set at the BBC Roath Lock studios in Cardiff, South Wales. Episode 16 of series 26 marked the final episode filmed in Bristol, with a fire destroying the department. The first episode from Cardiff, broadcast on 7 January 2012, was an 80-minute episode. Most exterior shots of the city of Holby are now shot within the city of Cardiff and wider area of South Wales. Railway scenes are shot on location at various preserved railways, which from the start of shooting have centred around the West Somerset Railway, the Avon Valley Railway and more recently the Barry Tourist Railway. In May 2018, filming for the premier of series 33 was shot in Bristol and Yate.

Broadcast

The programme has usually been transmitted on Saturday nights, although for a period in the late 1980s and early 1990s it switched to Fridays. The first two series each consisted of 15 episodes; series 3 ran for 10 episodes (although one of those episodes was postponed following the death of its guest star, Roy Kinnear); series 4, 5 and 6 were 12, 13, and 15 episodes long respectively. The final episode of series 6, which focused on a plane crash, was postponed until February 1992, after being initially scheduled for transmission on 20 December 1991 – one day before the 3rd anniversary of the Lockerbie disaster.

When the show moved back to Saturday nights in September 1992, the series length was extended to 24 episodes per year, and placed in a pre-watershed slot at approximately 8pm. This initially caused some controversy due to the graphic and controversial nature of some of the storylines. In 1997–8, the episode number was increased again, with 26 episodes (including two 75-minute specials) making up series 12. Subsequent series each saw an increase in episodes; series 13 ran for 28 episodes, series 14 ran for 30 episodes, series 15 ran for 36 episodes, series 16 and 17 ran for 40 episodes and series 18 ran for 46 episodes. Since 2004, popularity of the show resulted in a switch from a traditional seasonal format (which had progressed from three months in its early years to around seven months by 2001) to an almost year-round production and transmission — each series from series 19 (2004/5) to 25 (2010/11) has lasted for 48 episodes. However, this figure was dropped to 42 for series 26, with no summer break, which was related to production moving from Bristol to Cardiff. Series 27 consists of 44 episodesan increase of 2 episodes on the previous series and returned to 48 for series 28. In addition, from series 26, the show also began broadcasting in August of their respective years, rather than start in September with a two-week break in late December.

Casualty usually runs for 50 minutes between 20:0022:00 slot on BBC One. Special events such as the Eurovision Song Contest and sporting events sometimes see the schedule moved around. On most of these occasions, Casualty is taken off-air for the night to make way for alternative shows. It has been known in the past that if an episode is in two parts, part one will be aired on the Saturday and part two on Sunday. It is broadcast across Europe via BBC Entertainment on the same date.

Cast and characters

Casualty follows the professional and personal lives of the medical and ancillary staff of Holby City Hospital's emergency department. It features an ensemble cast of regular characters, and began with ten main characters in its first series. The original characters are consultant Ewart Plimmer (Bernard Gallagher), senior house officer Baz Samuels (Julia Watson), charge nurse Charlie Fairhead (Derek Thompson), staff nurse Clive King (George Harris), state enrolled nurse Megan Roach (Brenda Fricker), student nurse Lisa "Duffy" Duffin (Cathy Shipton), paramedics Sandra Mute and Andrew Ponting (Lisa Bowerman and Robert Pugh), receptionist Susie Mercier (Debbie Roza) and porter Kuba Trzcinski (Christopher Rozycki).

Currently, the regular cast consists of acting clinical lead Dylan Keogh (William Beck) and Stevie Nash (Elinor Lawless); foundation training doctor Rash Masum (Neet Mohan); clinical nurse manager, Jacob Masters (Charles Venn), senior charge nurse and emergency nurse practitioner Charlie Fairhead (Derek Thompson); advanced clinical practitioner Faith Cadogan (Kirsty Mitchell); staff nurses Robyn Miller (Amanda Henderson), David Hide (Jason Durr) and Marty Kirkby (Shaheen Jafargholi); operational duty manager Jan Jenning (Di Botcher), paramedics Iain Dean (Michael Stevenson), Teddy Jenning (Milo Clarke) and Sah (Arin Smethurst);.

A survey published by Radio Times magazine in March 2004 found that Casualty has featured more future stars than any other UK soap or drama series. Actors who appeared in the show before wider success include Kate Winslet, Orlando Bloom, Minnie Driver, Alfred Molina, Christopher Eccleston, Tom Hiddleston, Ashley Artus, Parminder Nagra, Caryn Edwards, Sadie Frost, Ray Winstone, David Walliams, Jonny Lee Miller, Martin Freeman, Helen Baxendale, Robson Green and Brenda Fricker. Discussing her 1993 appearance in Casualty, Winslet told the Radio Times: "In England, it almost seems to be part of a jobbing actor's training [to appear in Casualty]. As far as I was concerned it was a great episode, a great part. Appearing in Casualty taught me a big lesson in how to be natural in front of the camera." In addition, the series has featured a variety of more established stars, including Marina Sirtis, Norman Wisdom, Amanda Redman, Anita Dobson, Jenny Seagrove, Rula Lenska, Prunella Scales, Celia Imrie, Toyah Willcox, Maureen Lipman, Frances Barber, Andrew Sachs, Russ Abbot, Stephanie Beacham, Honor Blackman and Michelle Collins in cameo roles.

Home releases
The first three series of Casualty were released on DVD (Region 2, UK) by 2 Entertain/Cinema Club. The third was released to coincide with the show's 20th anniversary celebrations. In Australia the first series was released by Umbrella Entertainment. There are no future DVD releases planned at present for the UK or Australia.

International broadcast
Irish viewers can stream the series on the free RTÉ Player service.

American viewers can watch the series on Britbox, a subscription-based U.S. streaming service.

Adaptations and related media

Holby City

Holby City began on 12 January 1999 as a spin-off from Casualty and is named after the fictional Holby City Hospital in which both series are set. The show follows the lives and careers of staff and patients on the surgical wards of the hospital, and deals with a range of clinical and ethical issues. Similarly to Casualty, the regular characters are all surgeons, nurses and other medical and ancillary staff, with patients played by guest actors, including famous names such as Eric Sykes, Phill Jupitus, Michael Jayston, Michele Dotrice, Ronni Ancona, Emma Samms, Lee Ryan, Nikki Sanderson and Johnny Briggs. The show was created by Mal Young and Tony McHale, who became its executive producer between 2007 and 2010. He was succeeded by Casualty executive producer Belinda Campbell.

Casualty@Holby City

Reflecting Holby City origins as a spin-off from Casualty and the closely related premises of the two programmes, the BBC has screened occasional crossover mini-dramas entitled Casualty@Holby City, featuring a number of characters from each of the two casts. Mervyn Watson, former executive producer of Casualty, has commented on the origins of the idea to fully cross the two shows over for the first time: "I think the idea came from somebody in the comedy department, who casually said to the Controller of Drama 'Wouldn't it be a good idea if ...' The Controller did think it was a good idea, spoke to myself and Holby's executive producer, got it commissioned by the Head of BBC One and the rest is history."

Filming of Casualty@Holby City episodes is usually divided between Casualty's Bristol set, and Holby City Elstree studios, although a large proportion of the Christmas 2005 crossover was also filmed on location in a road tunnel in Caernarfon, Wales. The theme tune used for crossover episodes consists of a shortened version of both the Casualty and Holby City theme tunes, played over one another in sync, criticized by the Daily Mirror for being "basically both theme tunes played at once."

Interviewed before the Christmas 2005 crossover was broadcast, Watson commented on the future of Casualty@Holby City: "We can't guarantee any crossovers for next year, but the audience likes them. And as long as the Controller of BBC One wants them, then we'll be happy to oblige." In November 2007, Holby City producer Diana Kyle added: "We like to do crossovers whenever we can, but it's tricky because both Holby City and Casualty film for 52 weeks a year, so the actors on each show have to work flat-out on their own programmes. We are trying to create more opportunities where the two dramas can merge, though." Another crossover was broadcast in 2010, with Casualty producer Oliver Kent commenting that the production teams enjoy airing crossovers, and that the difficulty in producing them is "purely logistics".

HolbyBlue

In April 2006, the BBC announced that a spin-off drama from the show, to be named HolbyBlue, was in early stages of production. The series focuses on the police service of Holby South, and aired for the duration of its first series on BBC One on Tuesday nights, with Holby City switching back to its former Thursday night slot at 8:00pm. Long running Casualty character Charlie Fairhead appeared in HolbyBlue'''s first episode, and a full two-part crossover episode with Holby City aired at the beginning of the show's second series. On 6 August 2008, the BBC announced that HolbyBlue has been axed after two series.

Casualty 1900s

In December 2006, the BBC broadcast a historical medical drama titled Casualty 1906, reflecting life in the 'Receiving Room' (A+E was a concept not yet developed) of the Royal London Hospital 100 years previously, based on historical hospital records and news reports of the time. A three-episode miniseries, titled Casualty 1907, was developed for broadcast in 2008. Although not a direct spin-off, nor set in the same fictional location, The Times has suggested "that this is BBC high-concept brand-extension at its very best", with the BBC using the popularity of and viewer familiarity with Casualty to launch a new historical drama — a conclusion The Guardian also asserted. A third series, Casualty 1908, featuring Cherie Lunghi, was also commissioned. On 25 March 2009, it was announced that the BBC would be airing Casualty 1909'', a six-part series which aired in June and July 2009.

Awards and nominations

References

External links

 
 
 

1986 British television series debuts
1980s British medical television series
1980s British television soap operas
1980s British workplace drama television series
1990s British medical television series
1990s British television soap operas
1990s British workplace drama television series
2000s British medical television series
2000s British television soap operas
2000s British workplace drama television series
2010s British medical television series
2010s British television soap operas
2010s British workplace drama television series
2020s British medical television series
2020s British television soap operas
2020s British workplace drama television series
BBC Cymru Wales television shows
BBC high definition shows
BBC medical television shows
BBC television soap operas
English-language television shows
Holby
Lesbian-related television shows
Television shows shot in Bristol
Television shows set in England
Television series by BBC Studios